Samuel Edward Kennedy (born July 10, 1964 in San Mateo, California ) is a professional  in the National Football League. He attended San Jose State University and earned a degree in Industrial Engineering. He would play with the San Francisco 49ers in 1988 and win Super Bowl XXIII.
After retirement from American football, Sam began his dirt-track auto racing career and has 5 NASCAR sanction short track championships.
Business owner since 1995.

External links
Pro-Football reference

1964 births
Living people
Players of American football from California
San Francisco 49ers players
San Jose State Spartans football players
Sportspeople from the San Francisco Bay Area
People from San Mateo, California
Cabrillo Seahawks football players